Takatsugu Uda (born 25 October 1991) is a Japanese cross-country skier. 
He represented Japan at the FIS Nordic World Ski Championships 2015 in Falun.

References

External links 
 

1991 births
Living people
Tokai University alumni
Japanese male cross-country skiers
Competitors at the 2015 Winter Universiade
21st-century Japanese people